The Simon Mabhunu Sabela Film and Television Awards is an annual South African awards ceremony that recognises outstanding achievements and excellence within the South African film and television industry, with a special focus on KwaZulu-Natal. Among those honoured at the awards are mainly actors, producers, directors and various film and television technicians.

History
The awards were launched in 2013 in honour of the late TV and movie legend Simon Sabela.
The awards are an initiative of the Department of Economic Development Tourism and Environmental Affairs and are implemented by the KwaZulu-Natal Film Commission.

Awards
As of the 1st Simon Mabhunu Sabela film and television awards there are a total of 28 trophies that are awarded. The categories include best actor, best actress accolades, best supporting actor, best supporting actress, best newcomer and best director. Other categories include best screenplay, best use of KZN locations, best documentary short and best student film.

Categories

Television Categories
Best actor
Best actress
Best supporting actor
Best supporting actress
Best newcomer actor
Best newcomer actress

Film Categories
Best actor
Best actress
Best supporting actor
Best supporting actress
Best newcomer actor
Best newcomer actress
Best director
Best screenplay – Feature film
Best screenplay – Short
Best micro-budget
Best use of KZN as filming location  
Best use of KZN in a music video
Best feature film 
Best isiZulu film
Best Short Film
Best documentary short
Best documentary feature
Best student film
Lifetime achievement

Eligibility and entry
As per the committee guidelines, only citizens and permanent residents of South Africa who originate from the province of KwaZulu-Natal are eligible for a nomination.

References

External links
 Official SMSFTs site

South African television awards
South African film awards